George Mpanga (born 14 January 1991), better known by his stage name George the Poet, is a Peabody award-winning, British spoken-word artist, poet, rapper, and podcast host with an interest in social and political issues. Mpanga came to prominence as a poet, from which he progressed to spoken word and hip hop. This led to him being signed by Island Records and culminating in the release of his debut EP The Chicken and the Egg to critical acclaim. However, Mpanga felt constrained by the art form, quit rapping, and left his record label before the release of his debut album. He moved on to performing poetry and created a podcast entitled Have You Heard George's Podcast?

In 2018, Mpanga was elected to be a Member of the National Council of Arts for Arts Council England. Have You Heard George's Podcast? won five awards at the 2019 British Podcast Awards, including "Podcast of the Year".

In 2019, Have You Heard George's Podcast? won a Peabody Award, becoming the first podcast outside of the US to win the award.

Life and career
Mpanga was born to Ugandan parents on the St Raphael's Estate in Neasden, north-west London. His paternal grandmother is Ugandan politician and former cabinet minister Joyce Mpanga. He began performing rap and grime when he was 15 years old. He attended Queen Elizabeth's School, Barnet, an elite selective grammar school, during 2002–2009. He subsequently studied Politics, Psychology and Sociology at King's College, Cambridge (2010–2013), where he decided to adapt his rap output into poetry to communicate more effectively with his audience. Mpanga said, "I think rappers are primarily expected to make money for the industry and provide party soundtracks, but obviously there are exceptions and grey areas. The poet's 'role' is usually to provide thoughtful social commentary."

During his studies, Mpanga won a social enterprise competition organised by Barclays and Channel 4 called The Stake, which asked entrants how they would spend £100,000. He used his £16,000 prize to fund The Jubilee Line, a series of secondary school poetry workshops for underprivileged children in London. In May 2012, he premiered the piece "My City", about his hometown London. Subsequently, BBC Radio 1 selected him as the face of their Hackney Weekend (in June 2012), and Sky Sports F1 commissioned him to write poems for their coverage of the 2012 Formula One season and the 2013 Monaco Grand Prix. 
In July 2014, the consumer watchdog group Which? released the track "It's Yours", a collaboration between Mpanga and producer Jakwob, as part of a campaign lobbying the UK Government to improve their response to complaints about public services. "My City" was adapted as a music collaboration with dance producers Bodhi, and released as a single in August 2014. In October 2014, Mpanga released the EP The Chicken and the Egg and the single "1,2,1,2" (once again with Bodhi), describing the former release as "about premature parenthood. Through the story of a rocky relationship, it outlines the cycle of fatherlessness in seven tracks." Vice magazine wrote that the EP "showcases perhaps the tightest lyricism of the year to date".

In November 2014, it was announced that Mpanga had been shortlisted for the Critics' Choice category at the 2015 BRIT Awards. He came fifth in the BBC Sound of 2015 poll. As of late 2014, Mpanga was writing a debut album and working on theatre and film projects. He released the single "Cat D" in February 2015. His first collection of poetry in book form, 'Search Party', was published by Virgin Books in 2015.

In March 2018 it was announced that Mpanga had been elected as a Member of the National Council of Arts Council England. Shortly after, in June 2018, it came to media attention that Mpanga was stopped and searched by police in an incident which was video recorded. Mpanga opened the BBC coverage of the royal wedding, between Prince Harry and Megan Markle, by reading a love poem. He has also appeared twice on Question Time. In 2019, Mpanga turned down an offer to become an MBE, citing the British Empire's treatment of his ancestral homeland, Uganda.

, Mpanga was studying for a PhD in economics at University College London, focusing on the potential for black music to catalyse social power and economic progress.

Artistry
Mpanga's influences include rappers Nas, Dizzee Rascal, and Tupac Shakur, and poets including Maya Angelou, Black Ice, and George Watsky.

Discography

Extended plays
The Chicken and the Egg (2014)

Singles
 "It's Yours" (2014)
 "My City" (2014)
 "1,2,1,2" (2014)
 "Cat D" (2015)
 "Wotless" (2015)
 "Search Party" (2015)
 "Search Party 2" (2015)
 "What Do You Reckon?" (2016)
 "Wake Up" (2016)
 "Follow the Leader" (2018)
 "Make a Change" (2021)

Guest appearances and collaborations
 "Young Kingz Part 1" (2013). Collaboration with Krept & Konan
 "The Lucky Strike EP" (2013). Collaboration with Mikill Pane
 "Act I" (2013). Collaboration with Naughty Boy
 "Act II" (2013). Collaboration with Naughty Boy
 "Epilogue" (2013). Collaboration with Naughty Boy
 "In The Quiet" (2014). Collaboration with Nick Brewer and Max Marshall
 "My City" (2014). Collaboration with Bodhi
 "Spoken Word" (2016). Collaboration with Chase & Status
 "Royalty" (2018). Collaboration with Dun D and Tiggs Da Author
 "If I Gotta Go" (2021). Collaboration with Skrapz

Podcast discography

Have You Heard George's Podcast Chapter One (2018) 

Episode 1 – Listen Closer
Episode 2 – Popcorn
Episode 3 – A Grenfell Story
Episode 3.5 – Grenfell II
Episode 4 – It's On Us
Episode 5 – Press Play
Episode 6 – The Journey Pt I
Episode 7 – The Journey Pt II
Episode 8 – Sanyu's World

Have You Heard George's Podcast Chapter Two (2019) 

Episode 9 – Sabrina's Boy
Episode 10 – A Bedtime Story
Episode 11 – Writer's Block
Episode 12 – A Night to REMember
Episode 13 – A North West Story
Episode 14 – A Hard Taskmaster
Episode 15 – Who Am I?
Episode 16 – Loose Ends
Episode 17 – The Bag
Episode 18 – Concurrent Affairs

Have You Heard George's Podcast Chapter Three (2021) 

Episode 19
Episode 20
Episode 21
Episode 22
Episode 23
Episode 24
Episode 25
Episode 26
Episode 27
Episode 28

Awards and nominations

References

External links
 

21st-century English musicians
21st-century English poets
21st-century English male writers
1991 births
Alumni of King's College, Cambridge
Artists from London
English people of Ugandan descent
British spoken word artists
Island Records artists
Living people
People educated at Queen Elizabeth's Grammar School for Boys
People from Neasden
Rappers from London
Spoken word poets
English spoken word artists
20th-century English poets
English male poets